Lake Isabella is a large man-made reservoir in Kern County, California.

Lake Isabella may also refer to:

 Lake Isabella, California, a community in Kern County
 Lake Isabella, Michigan, a village
 Lake Isabella Historic Residential District, Florida
 Lake Isabella State Forest, Minnesota

See also
 Isabella Lake (Alberta), a lake in Canada
 Lake Isabelle, a lake in Dakota County, Minnesota
 Lake Isabel (disambiguation)